The men's decathlon event at the 1998 World Junior Championships in Athletics was held in Annecy, France, at Parc des Sports on 29 and 30 July.  Senior implements (106.7 cm (3'6) hurdles, 7257g shot, 2 kg discus) were used.

Medalists

Results

Final
29/30 July

Participation
According to an unofficial count, 22 athletes from 17 countries participated in the event.

References

Decathlon
Combined events at the World Athletics U20 Championships